Furcohaptor is a genus of monopisthocotylean monogeneans, belonging to the family Diplectanidae. All known species are parasitic on the gills of Tonguefish (Family Cynoglossidae).

Members of the genus Furcohaptor have a haptor with atypical structure (two long haptoral arms, one pair of typical anchors, one pair of rod-shaped hooks, five pairs of typical-shaped marginal hooks, and one pair of marginal hooks which are reduced in size) and the genus was originally placed in the family Ancyrocephalidae, but a study based on morphology and molecules demonstrated in 2017 that it was a member of the Diplectanidae.

Species
According to the World Register of Marine Species, the valid species included in the genus are:
 Furcohaptor brevis Nitta & Nagasawa, 2017 
 Furcohaptor cynoglossi Bijukumar & Kearn, 1996

References

Diplectanidae
Monogenea genera